In phonetics, a nasal, also called a nasal occlusive or nasal stop in contrast with an oral stop or nasalized consonant, is an occlusive consonant produced with a lowered velum, allowing air to escape freely through the nose. The vast majority of consonants are oral consonants. Nasal occlusives are nearly universal in human languages. There are also other kinds of nasal consonants in some languages.

Definition 
Nearly all nasal consonants are nasal occlusives, in which air escapes through the nose but not through the mouth, as it is blocked (occluded) by the lips or tongue. The oral cavity still acts as a resonance chamber for the sound. Rarely, non-occlusive consonants may be nasalized.

Voiceless nasals occur in a few languages such as Burmese, Welsh, Icelandic and Guaraní. (Compare oral stops, which block off the air completely, and fricatives, which obstruct the air with a narrow channel. Both stops and fricatives are more commonly voiceless than voiced, and are known as obstruents.)

In terms of acoustics, nasals are sonorants, which means that they do not significantly restrict the escape of air (as it can freely escape out the nose). However, nasals are also obstruents in their articulation because the flow of air through the mouth is blocked. This duality, a sonorant airflow through the nose along with an obstruction in the mouth, means that nasal occlusives behave both like sonorants and like obstruents.

Acoustically, nasals have bands of energy at around 200 and 2,000 Hz.

1.

Examples of languages containing nasal occlusives:

The voiced palatal nasal  is a common sound in European languages, such as: Spanish , French and Italian , Catalan and Hungarian , Czech and Slovak , Polish , Occitan and Portuguese , and (before a vowel) Modern Greek .

They are represented in romanisation by m, n, hm, hn, ny, and ng. Nuosu also contrasts nasalised stops and affricates with their voiced, unvoiced, and aspirated versions. 

Nevertheless, among many younger speakers of Rioplatense Spanish, there is no palatal nasal but only a palatalized nasal, as in English canyon.

What would be coda nasal occlusives in other West Iberian languages is only slightly pronounced before dental consonants. Outside this environment the nasality is spread over the vowel or become a nasal diphthong (mambembe , outside the final, only in Brazil, and mantém  in all Portuguese dialects).

Welsh has a set of voiceless nasals, [m̥], [n̥] and [ŋ̊], which occur predominantly as a result of nasal mutation of their voiced counterparts ([m], [n] and [ŋ]).

The Mapos Buang language of New Guinea has a phonemic uvular nasal, [ɴ], which contrasts with a velar nasal. It is extremely rare for a language to have [ɴ] as a phoneme.

Yanyuwa is highly unusual in that it has a seven-way distinction between [m], [n̪], [n], [ɳ], [ṉ] (palato-alveolar), [ŋ̟] (front velar), and [ŋ̠] (back velar). This may be the only language in existence that contrasts nasals at seven distinct points of articulation.

The term 'nasal occlusive' (or 'nasal stop') is generally abbreviated to nasal. However, there are also nasalized fricatives, nasalized flaps, nasal glides, and nasal vowels, as in French, Portuguese, and Polish. In the IPA, nasal vowels and nasalized consonants are indicated by placing a tilde (~) over the vowel or consonant in question: French sang , Portuguese bom .

Voiceless nasals
A few languages have phonemic voiceless nasal occlusives. Among them are Icelandic, Faroese, Burmese, Jalapa Mazatec, Kildin Sami, Welsh, and Central Alaskan Yup'ik.

Other kinds of nasal consonant
Ladefoged and Maddieson (1996) distinguish purely nasal consonants, the nasal occlusives such as m n ng in which the airflow is purely nasal, from partial nasal consonants such as prenasalized consonants and nasal pre-stopped consonants, which are nasal for only part of their duration, as well as from nasalized consonants, which have simultaneous oral and nasal airflow. In some languages, such as Portuguese, a nasal consonant may have occlusive and non-occlusive allophones. In general, therefore, a nasal consonant may be:

 a nasal occlusive, such as English m, n, ng
 a nasal approximant, as in nh in some Portuguese dialects
 a nasal flap, such as the nasal retroflex lateral flap in Pashto
 prenasalized consonants, pre-stopped nasals and post-stopped nasals
 nasal clicks such as Zulu nq, nx, nc
 other nasalized consonants, such as nasalized fricatives

Languages without nasals
A few languages, perhaps 2%, contain no phonemically distinctive nasals. This led Ferguson (1963) to assume that all languages have at least one primary nasal occlusive. However, there are exceptions.

Lack of phonemic nasals
When a language is claimed to lack nasals altogether, as with several Niger–Congo languages or the Pirahã language of the Amazon, nasal and non-nasal or prenasalized consonants usually alternate allophonically, and it is a theoretical claim on the part of the individual linguist that the nasal is not the basic form of the consonant. In the case of some Niger–Congo languages, for example, nasals occur before only nasal vowels. Since nasal vowels are phonemic, it simplifies the picture somewhat to assume that nasalization in occlusives is allophonic. There is then a second step in claiming that nasal vowels nasalize oral occlusives, rather than oral vowels denasalizing nasal occlusives, that is, whether  are phonemically  without full nasals, or  without prenasalized stops. Postulating underlying oral or prenasalized stops rather than true nasals helps to explain the apparent instability of nasal correspondences throughout Niger–Congo compared with, for example, Indo-European.

This analysis comes at the expense, in some languages, of postulating either a single nasal consonant that can only be syllabic, or a larger set of nasal vowels than oral vowels, both typologically odd situations. The way such a situation could develop is illustrated by a Jukunoid language, Wukari. Wukari allows oral vowels in syllables like ba, mba and nasal vowels in bã, mã, suggesting that nasals become prenasalized stops before oral vowels. Historically, however, *mb became **mm before nasal vowels, and then reduced to *m, leaving the current asymmetric distribution.

Tlingit is usually described as having an unusual, perhaps unique lack of  despite having five lateral obstruents; the older generation could be argued to have  but at the expense of having no nasals.

Lack of phonetic nasals
Several of languages surrounding Puget Sound, such as Quileute (Chimakuan family), Lushootseed (Salishan family), and Makah (Wakashan family), are truly without any nasalization whatsoever, in consonants or vowels, except in special speech registers such as baby talk or the archaic speech of mythological figures (and perhaps not even that in the case of Quileute). This is an areal feature, only a few hundred years old, where nasals became voiced stops ( became , etc.) after colonial contact. For example, "Snohomish" is currently pronounced sdohobish, but was transcribed with nasals in the first English-language records.

The only other places in the world where this is known to occur are in Melanesia. In the central dialect of the Rotokas language of Bougainville Island, nasals are only used when imitating foreign accents. (A second dialect has a series of nasals.) The Lakes Plain languages of West Irian are similar.

The  unconditioned loss of nasals, as in Puget Sound, is unusual. This started out in nonstandard dialects and was restricted to the beginning of prosodic units (a common position for fortition), but has expanded to many speakers of the standard language to the beginnings of common words even within prosodic units.

See also
 Oral consonant
 Nasal click
 Nasal vowel
 Nasalization
 List of phonetics topics
 Syllabic consonant

Notes

References

Bibliography
Ferguson (1963) 'Assumptions about nasals', in Greenberg (ed.) Universals of Language, pp. 50–60.
Saout, J. le (1973) 'Languages sans consonnes nasales', Annales de l Université d'Abidjan, H, 6, 1, 179–205.
Williamson, Kay (1989) 'Niger–Congo overview', in Bendor-Samuel & Hartell (eds.) The Niger–Congo Languages, 3–45.

Manner of articulation